Catephia xylois is a species of moth of the  family Erebidae. It is found in Malaysia.

References

Catephia
Moths described in 1925
Moths of Asia